During 1955–56 Associazione Calcio Fiorentina competed in Serie A.

Summary 
1956 was the year of first Scudetto for the Fiorentina. The team started to achieve consistent top-five finishes in the domestic league, consisted of great players such as well-known goalkeeper Giuliano Sarti, Sergio Cervato, Francesco Rosella, Guido Gratton, Giuseppe Chiappella and Aldo Scaramucci but above all, the attacking of Brazilian Julinho Argentinian Miguel Montuori and young striker Giuseppe Virgili . This team won Fiorentina's first scudetto (Italian championship) in 1955–56, 12 points ahead of second-place Milan.

Squad

Competitions

Serie A

League table

Matches

Statistics

Appearances

34 – Gratton, Segato
33 – Cervato
32 – Chiappella
32 – Magnini
32 – Montuori
32 – Virgili 
31 – Julinho
26 – Prini
25 – Sarti
20 – Rosetta
18 – Orzan
9 – Toros
6 – Bizarri
4 – Mazza
2 – Bartoli, Carpanesi, Scaramucci

Goalscorers
21 – Virgili
13 – Montuori
6 – Julinho, Prini
5 – Cervato
3 – Gratton
1 – Bizzarri, Carpanesi, Magnini
Owngoals: 2

References

External links
 Statistiche del girone d'andata, Violagol.com
 I viola campioni, Violagol.com
 Rosa, trasferimenti e organigramma tecnico, Violagol.com
 Precampionato 1955–56, Violagol.com

ACF Fiorentina seasons
Fiorentina
Italian football championship-winning seasons